Tuka Tisam (born 8 July 1986) in the Cook Islands is a footballer who plays as a midfielder. He currently plays for Nikao Sokattack F.C. in the Cook Islands Round Cup and the Cook Islands national football team.

Career statistics

International

Statistics accurate as of match played 26 November 2011

References

1986 births
Living people
Cook Islands international footballers
Association football midfielders
People educated at Mount Albert Grammar School
Cook Island footballers
Expatriate football managers in Fiji
Expatriate soccer players in the United States
Expatriate association footballers in New Zealand
Women's national association football team managers